From April 21 to April 28, 1788, delegates met to decide whether to ratify the Constitution of the United States. This list of delegates reports the men who made up the convention, and the counties or towns they represented.

George Plater served as president of the convention, and Wiliam Harwood served as secretary.  On April 28, 1788, the convention ratified the Constitution of the United States, in a vote of 63 in favor and 11 opposed. The 63 delegates in favor signed their names to a written copy of the Constitution, making Maryland the only of the first thirteen states to sign their approval in ink.

List of delegates
The following individuals served as delegates to the state convention.

Notes
At the time, Howard County did not exist yet. It was separated from Anne Arundel County and named the Howard District of Anne Arundel County in 1839. In 1851, it was established as Howard County.

Alleghany County did not exist yet. It was separated from Washington County in 1789.

Garrett County did not exist yet. It was separated from Allegheny County in 1872.

See also
 Text of Resolution of Ratification of the Constitution of the United States by Maryland via Wikisource

References  

Maryland in the American Revolution
Maryland
Maryland
Convention